Hypericin is a naphthodianthrone, an anthraquinone derivative which, together with hyperforin, is one of the principal active constituents of Hypericum (Saint John's wort). Hypericin is believed to act as an antibiotic, antiviral and non-specific kinase inhibitor. Hypericin may inhibit the action of the enzyme dopamine β-hydroxylase, leading to increased dopamine levels, although thus possibly decreasing norepinephrine and epinephrine.

It was initially believed that the anti-depressant pharmacological activity of hypericin was due to inhibition of monoamine oxidase enzyme. The crude extract of Hypericum is a weak inhibitor of MAO-A and MAO-B. Isolated hypericin does not display this activity, but does have some affinity for NMDA receptors. This points in the direction that other constituents are responsible for the MAOI effect. The current belief is that the mechanism of antidepressant activity is due to the inhibition of re-uptake of certain neurotransmitters.

The large chromophore system in the molecule means that it can cause photosensitivity when ingested beyond threshold amounts. Photosensitivity is often seen in animals that have been allowed to graze on St. John's Wort. Because hypericin accumulates preferentially in cancerous tissues, it is also used as an indicator of cancerous cells. In addition, hypericin is under research as an agent in photodynamic therapy, whereby a biochemical is absorbed by an organism to be later activated with spectrum-specific light from specialized lamps or laser sources, for therapeutic purposes. The antibacterial and antiviral effects of hypericin are also believed to arise from its ability for photo-oxidation of cells and viral particles.

Hypericin derives from  cyclisation of polyketides.

The biosynthesis of hypericins is through the polyketide pathway where an octaketide chain goes through successive cyclizations and decarboxylations to form emodin anthrone which is believed to be the precursor of hypericin. Oxidization reactions yield protoforms which then are converted into hypericin and pseudohypericin. These reactions are photosensitive and take place under exposure to light and using the enzyme Hyp-1.

References 

Virucides
Polyketides
Polyols
Chemicals in Hypericum
Biological pigments
3-Hydroxypropenals within hydroxyquinones